The London, Brighton and South Coast Railway (LB&SCR) H1 class was a class of 4-4-2 steam locomotives for express passenger work.  They were designed by D. E. Marsh and were built by Messrs Kitson and Company in 1905 and 1906.

History
Prior to taking up office as the Locomotive Superintendent of the LB&SCR in 1905, Marsh had worked for the Great Northern Railway at Doncaster Works. There he had been involved in the design of the Klondyke class designed by Henry Ivatt in 1897. There was an urgent need for new large express passenger locomotives for the LB&SCR, and so he obtained a set of drawings of the large-boilered GNR Atlantics from Doncaster, and made only detailed amendments before ordering them from the manufacturer.

Performance
The class soon proved to be successful working the London to Brighton express trains including the heavily loaded Pullman services the "Brighton Limited", and The Southern Belle, which the LB&SCR described as "the most luxurious train in the World".

Superheating
In May 1920, L. B. Billinton wished to install the Schmidt superheater to improve the efficiency of the class, but was refused permission to do so by the Brighton Locomotive Committee. This modification was however carried out by Richard Maunsell of the Southern Railway during 1925–1926 after the Grouping of 1923.

Re-allocation

During 1925 and 1926 the H1 class were gradually replaced on the London-Brighton express trains by the "King Arthur" and "River" classes, but there was still plenty of work for them on other express services, including the boat trains connecting with the Newhaven-Dieppe ferry service.

Withdrawal
Following the cessation of the cross-channel ferries after 1940, as a result of the Second World War the class were left with little work to do and several were put into store or else moved to miscellaneous duties in southern England, and the first members of the class were withdrawn in 1944.

In July 1947, No. 2039 was experimentally rebuilt with sleeve valves by Oliver Bulleid as a mobile test bed in preparation for his Leader class locomotives. It was never returned to its original state and in common with the remainder of the class had been withdrawn by 1951. All members of the class were scrapped.

Locomotive summary

No. 39 was named La France in connection with the visit to Portsmouth of Raymond Poincaré, the President of France; the locomotive was often used for royal trains and other important special trains, and had been selected to haul the train conveying Poincaré. The whole class was named (and no. 39 renamed) during 1925–26 because the Southern Railway's publicity department had decided that express passenger locomotives should be named in order to improve the railway's image. For this class, the names selected were of coastal landmarks in southern England.

References

External links 

 Rail UK database, H1

4-4-2 locomotives
H1
Railway locomotives introduced in 1905
Scrapped locomotives
Standard gauge steam locomotives of Great Britain